Gabriel Hjertstedt (born 5 December 1971) is a Swedish professional golfer.

Hjertstedt was born in Umeå, Sweden. His family relocated to Australia when he was eleven and he learned to play golf there. He turned professional in 1990 and spent time on the PGA Tour of Australasia and the Japan Golf Tour. He played on the European Tour from 1993 to 1996, where his best results were a pair of second places in 1994. In his 1997 rookie year on the U.S.-based PGA Tour he won the B.C. Open the same week that Europe won that year's Ryder Cup, to become the first Swede to win on the PGA Tour. He followed up in 1999 by claiming his second PGA Tour title at the Touchstone Energy Tucson Open. He represented Sweden in the Dunhill Cup in 1994 and 1999. He has not played a PGA Tour-sanctioned event since 2009.

Amateur wins (2)
1989 Doug Sanders World Junior Championship, European Boys Championship

Professional wins (2)

PGA Tour wins (2)

PGA Tour playoff record (1–0)

Results in major championships

CUT = missed the half-way cut
"T" = tied

Team appearances
Amateur
Jacques Léglise Trophy (representing the Continent of Europe): 1989
Eisenhower Trophy (representing Sweden): 1990 (winners)
St Andrews Trophy (representing the Continent of Europe): 1990

Professional
Dunhill Cup (representing Sweden): 1994, 1999

See also
1996 PGA Tour Qualifying School graduates

References

External links

Swedish male golfers
European Tour golfers
PGA Tour of Australasia golfers
Japan Golf Tour golfers
PGA Tour golfers
Sportspeople from Umeå
1971 births
Living people